Norumbega Castle is a historic house at 63 High Street in Camden, Maine.  Built in 1886-87 for duplex telegraph inventor Joseph Barker Stearns, it is one of Mid Coast Maine's most elaborate 19th-century summer houses, exhibiting a sophisticated Queen Anne style in stone and wood.  It now houses the Norumbega Inn, a bed and breakfast inn.  It was listed on the National Register of Historic Places in 1974.

Description and history
Norumbega Castle stands north of downtown Camden, on the southeast side of High Street (United States Route 1), beyond its junction with Marine Drive.  It is a -story structure, finished in rusticated stone with brick and wooden trim.  It is basically rectangular in shape, but its features are asymmetrically arranged, typical for the Queen Anne period.  Its main facade has three sections.  The center section rises three stories, and is topped by a stepped gable.  The right section, also three stories, has a projecting section topped by a conical turret.  The interior is elaborately finished, and featured the latest innovations in modern households of the period, including electric lights and steam heat.

Norumbega was designed by New York City architect Arthur B. Jennings, and built a local contractor in 1886–87.  It was built for Joseph Barker Stearns, a native of Weld, Maine, who made a fortune in the telegraph industry by patenting duplex telegraphy and licensing it worldwide.  Jennings also designed the estate's carriage house, which is now in separate ownership, and is also listed on the National Register of Historic Places.

See also
National Register of Historic Places listings in Knox County, Maine

References

External links

Norumbega Inn web site

Houses on the National Register of Historic Places in Maine
National Register of Historic Places in Knox County, Maine
Queen Anne architecture in Maine
Houses completed in 1886
Houses in Knox County, Maine
Buildings and structures in Camden, Maine
Historic district contributing properties in Maine